António José Parreira do Livramento ComIH (28 February 1943 – 7 June 1999) was a Portuguese roller hockey player and coach. A forward, he is revered as one of the sport's greatest players, and by some as the greatest ever.

Player career
Born in Évora, Livramento first started to play football, when he was invited to play roller hockey at Futebol Benfica in 1959, as he did. He represented Benfica, from 1959–60 to 1969–70, and after a year absent, from 1971–72 to 1973–74, Banco Pinto & Sotto Mayor, from 1974–75 to 1975–76, Sporting CP in 1976–77, Amatori Lodi, in Italy, in 1977–78, and another period for Sporting CP, from 1978–79 to 1980–81.
 
He started to play at the youth category of Portugal in 1960, being considered the best player at the Youth Rink Hockey European Championship. He soon was called for the main team, winning the Rink Hockey European Championship, in 1961, and the Rink Hockey World Championship, the following year. During his long career, Livramento was capped 209 times, scoring 425 goals, from 1961 to 1977. The sad incident with a Spanish player at the 1977 Rink Hockey Championship final, led him to leave the national team.

Livramento won 3 Rink Hockey World Championship, in 1962, 1968 and 1974, and 7 Rink Hockey European Championship, in 1961, 1963, 1965, 1967, 1973, 1975 and 1977.

Coach career
After ending his playing career, Livramento started a coach career. He was the coach of Bassano Hockey 54, in Italy, from 1984–85 to 1985–86. He would be also the coach of Sporting CP and the Portugal national team, winning 3 World Championships, in 1982, 1991 and 1993, and 3 European Championships, in 1987, 1992 and 1994. He resigned after the unsuccessful presence at the 1995 World Championship.

Death
Livramento died in Lisbon, Portugal, on 7 June 1999 from a stroke at the age of 56.

Honours
Orders
 Commander of the Order of Prince Henry

Player

Club
SL Benfica
Portuguese First Division: 1959-60, 1960-61, 1965-66, 1966-67, 1967-68, 1969-70, 1971-72, 1973-74
Portuguese Cup: 1962-63
Nations Cup: 1962

HC Monza
Coppa Italia: 1970-71

Sporting CP
Portuguese First Division: 1976-1977
Portuguese Cup: 1976-77
European Cup: 1976-77

Amatori Lodi
Coppa Italia: 1977-78

Country
Portugal
 Nations Cup: 1963, 1965, 1968, 1970, 1973
 World Championship – A: 1962, 1968, 1974
 European Championship: 1961, 1963, 1965, 1967, 1973, 1975, 1977

Coach

Club
Sporting
Portuguese First Division: 1981-82, 1987-88
Portuguese Cup: 1983-84
Portuguese Super Cup: 1983
CERH Cup Winners' Cup: 1980-81
CERS Cup: 1983-84

Porto
Portuguese First Division: 1998-99
Portuguese Cup: 1998-99
Portuguese Super Cup: 1998

Country
Portugal
Nations Cup: 1984, 1987, 1994
World Championship – A: 1982, 1993
European Championship: 1987, 1992, 1994
World Games: 1993

References

External links
 António Livramento tribute page 

1943 births
1999 deaths
People from Évora
Portuguese roller hockey players
Portuguese roller hockey coaches
S.L. Benfica (roller hockey)
Sporting CP roller hockey players
Sportspeople from Évora District